The Riiser-Larsen Peninsula is a large peninsula which forms the western portal to Lützow-Holm Bay and marks the separation of the Princess Ragnhild and Prince Harald Coasts. It was named after Captain Hjalmar Riiser-Larsen who discovered the peninsula in a flight from the Norvegia on 21 February 21 1931.

Important Bird Area
A 1.75 square mile site on fast ice that forms in north-western Lützow-Holm Bay close to the  peninsula has been designated an Important Bird Area (IBA) by BirdLife International because it supports a breeding colony of about 4,600 emperor penguins, estimated from 2009 satellite imagery.

References

External links 

 
Important Bird Areas of Antarctica
Penguin colonies
Peninsulas of Antarctica